Strangalia famelica is a species of flower longhorn in the beetle family Cerambycidae. It is found in North America.

Subspecies
These two subspecies belong to the species Strangalia famelica:
 Strangalia famelica famelica Newman, 1841
 Strangalia famelica solitaria Haldeman, 1847

References

Further reading

External links

 

Lepturinae
Articles created by Qbugbot
Beetles described in 1841